Liosmor may refer to:

Lismore, County Waterford, Ireland
Lismore, Scotland